Boscobel College for Young Ladies was a college in Nashville, founded in 1889 as the Nashville Baptist Female College by the Tennessee Baptist Convention.  The college operated for twenty-five years — until 1916.  One of its founding objectives was to provide the lowest possible cost for higher-education of young women.

The school, at its peak in the 1890s, had over 100 female students, many of whom were boarders.  In 1898, Boscobel advertised its literary faculty and music and art advantages as unsurpassed, and promised to prepare young ladies for life's work and its duties.

The property 
The campus was built around an East Nashville mansion, formerly owned by Anna Shelby Barrow.  The mansion was constructed of blue-burned brick with marble mantles from Italy and stood atop a tree-covered hill overlooking the Cumberland River.  The campus covered ten wooded acres on Sevier Street near South Seventh Street (then called Foster Street), south of Sylvan Street.

Boscobal was the same name given to the property by John Shelby, who built the original mansion for his daughter, Anna Shelby Barrow.

In June 1917, the property became home to the National Baptist Seminary and Missionary Training School, which functioned until 1931. In 1940 the buildings were razed and sold for scrap. Much of the site of the old school is now the James A. Cayce Homes, Nashville 's oldest and largest public housing development.

Closing of the college 
Boscobel College closed in 1916 on account of the East Nashville fire. Other local schools for females closed during this same era: Radnor College in 1914, Buford College in 1920, Columbia's Athenaeum college in 1907, and Franklin's Tennessee Female College in 1913.

People 
Presidents
 1891: J.P. Hamilton, M.E.L., A.B., A.M., 1857 graduate of Southwestern Baptist University, Jackson, Mississippi
 1892–1993: John Galen Paty (1860–1931)
 1893: Zuinglius Calvin Graves (1816–1906)
 1895–1897: John Galen Paty (1860–1931)
 1897: Henry G. Lamar, Sr. (born 1845) was also a professor at Boscobel; before 1997, he had been the business manager for Southern Female University in Birmingham, Alabama 
 1899–1904: Carey Albert Folk (1867–1957) graduated from Richmond College and attended Johns Hopkins University
 1904–1912: Cynthia Rust (née Westfall; 1859–1925), widow of Dr. John O'Brian Rust
 1912: Luane Everett (née Watson; 1870–1913)

Regents
 1896–1904: Dr. John O'Brian Rust (Reverend) (1859–1904)
 1916: Mrs. N.J. Ellis

Trustees
 1914: Rev. William N. Lunsford (born 1870), President of the Board of Trustees
 1914: William Hume, Secretary of the Board of Trustees

Principals
 1893–1994: John Galen Paty (1860–1931)
 Alice Foxworthy Glasscock, Lady Principal
 Eliza Crostwait
 I.P. Hamilton

Teachers
 Mrs. Annie M. Woodall, director of the School of Expression at Boscobel College; she was a graduate Bouhy Method of Voice, Paris; the New York School of Expression; the Columbia College of Expression, Chicago; and she did special studies at the Boston School of Expression; Woodall was soloist and choir director at the Trinity Church in Nashville; she taught a year at Oxford College, Oxford, North Carolina, and taught a dozen years at the Nashville Conservatory of Music and Boscobel College 
 Late 1880s (for about two years): Minnie Gattinger (1857–1944), taught fine art and German
 1895–1896: Maria Louisa Arnold (1836–1914) was an 1859 graduate of Mary Sharp College
 1893–1896: William Owen Carver (1842–1954), taught philosophy, Latin, Greek, German, and psychology
 1912: Grace Boyd Kennon (1877–1962), taught ethics, philosophy, and science at Boscobel; taught Indians in the Indian Territories, married Joseph Gamett Campbell (1861–1938)
 Luane Everett (née Watson; 1870–1913)
 Ophilia Bayer (née Mitchell; 1872–1914) taught music; she was married to Julius Henry Bayer (born 1868), also a teacher
 circa 1897: Eliza Jane McKissack taught music
 1997–: Miss C. Janes; previously had been principals at Southern Female University in Birmingham, Alabama 
 1997–: Miss E. Janes; previously had been principals at Southern Female University in Birmingham, Alabama
 1892–1897: Minnie Gattinger (1857–1944), instructor of German and drawing at Boscobel; she studied with German-born Nashville artist, George Dury (1817–1894) and German-born American artist Carl Christian Brenner at the Academy of Fine Arts, Philadelphia, and the Académie Delécluse, Paris; exhibited works at the Salon des Champs-Élysées, 1896; was instructor of art at Judson Institute, 1891–1892; became director of the art department at Peabody College for Teachers in 1897.  Her father, Augustin Gattinger, MD (1825–1903), married Josephine Dury in 1849 — sister of George Dury; George Dury was the brother of her father's wife.
 1898–: Maud Sallee

Former students
 1895–1896: Margaret Graves (Maria Louisa Arnold's cousin)
 Agnes Shepard Bates (1886–1912); music teacher in Earlington, Kentucky.  She studied post graduate music Boscobel, although the institution had no "official" graduate program.  Before attending Boscobel, she taught music at Bethel University (Tennessee).
 Verna Holt, from Nacogdoches, Texas
 Margaret M. Beatty, from Nashville
 Edith A. Roper (1874–1962) — earned an A.B. from Boscobel in 1894; she later taught science at Boscobel, Jessamine Institute (1894–1898); Boscobel College (1899); Milan, Tennessee (1900–1902); Georgetown College (Kentucky) (1902–1905); Union University, Tennessee (1906–1908); Alabama Central College (1908–1909); Howard Payne University (1909–?); Baylor College for Women
 Ellen Jane Douglas Jones Ginn (née Jones; 1878–1982), married Max Medison Ginn (died 1928) in 1903
 Mattie Pauline Martin
 Sarah Lois Grime earned a B.A. from Boscobel, and a B.S. & M.S. from Peabody College in Nashville; she retired as a faculty member of Texas A&I University in Kingsville, Texas, in 1949
 Inez Carter, graduated 1908, taught in the Latta, South Carolina, public schools
 Reine Alexander (1887–1961) went on to teach mathematics at Baton Rouge High School, then was its principal until her retirement in 1954

Publications 
 Salmagundi, college yearbook, Vol. 1 (1905) through Vol. 9 (1914), softcovers

Images 
Tennessee State Library and Archives
 Image 461
 Image 462
 Image 463
 Image 464

References 
Substantial records and correspondence
 Robert Boyte Crawford Howell (1878-1955) Papers, 1838–1963, Tennessee Department of State, State Library and Archives, Microfilm Accession No. 1270 (1972); 

Inline citations

Educational institutions established in 1889
Universities and colleges in Nashville, Tennessee
Defunct private universities and colleges in Tennessee
Former women's universities and colleges in the United States
History of Tennessee
1889 establishments in Tennessee